The Times of Swaziland is a newspaper in Eswatini (formerly called Swaziland). It is the oldest newspaper in Eswatini, having been established in 1897 by Allister Mitchel Miller (1864-1951).

References

External links 
 

Publications established in 1897
English-language newspapers published in Africa
Newspapers published in Eswatini
1897 establishments in Africa